Hurricane Isaias was a destructive Category 1 hurricane that caused extensive damage across the Caribbean and the East Coast of the United States while also spawning a large tropical tornado outbreak that generated the strongest tropical cyclone-spawned tornado since Hurricane Rita in 2005. The ninth named storm and second hurricane of the extremely active and record-breaking 2020 Atlantic hurricane season, Isaias originated from a vigorous tropical wave off the coast of Africa that was first identified by the National Hurricane Center on July 23. The tropical wave gradually became more organized and obtained gale-force winds on July 28 before organizing into Tropical Storm Isaias on July 30. Isaias marked the earliest ninth named storm on record, surpassing 2005's Hurricane Irene by eight days. On August 1, the storm made landfall on North Andros, Bahamas and subsequently weakened to a tropical storm, before paralleling the east coast of Florida and Georgia. As Isaias approached the Carolina coastline, it reintensified back into a hurricane. The storm proceeded to accelerate up the East Coast of the United States as a strong tropical storm, before transitioning into an extratropical cyclone over Quebec on August 4. Isaias's extratropical remnants persisted for another day, before dissipating on August 5.

Numerous tropical storm watches and warnings as well as hurricane watches and hurricane warnings were issued for the Lesser Antilles, Greater Antilles, Bahamas, Cuba, and the East Coast of the United States. Isaias impacted portions of the Eastern Caribbean and caused significant damage in the Eastern United States. Devastating flooding and wind damage was reported in Puerto Rico and the Dominican Republic, with many towns without electricity or drinking water. Trees were uprooted and power lines were downed in much of the Eastern United States, with more than 3 million power outages reported, nearly half of them in New Jersey. Isaias was the second tropical cyclone to affect the Northeastern States in a 3-week time span after Tropical Storm Fay in early July. Many people were without power for days after the storm in New York and Connecticut, leading to investigations into power and electricity companies. There were 17 storm-related deaths (direct and indirect): 14 in the contiguous United States, two in the Dominican Republic, and one in Puerto Rico. Overall, Isaias caused approximately $5.025 billion (2020 USD) in damage, with $4.8 billion in damage occurring in the U.S. alone, making Isaias the costliest tropical cyclone to affect the Northeastern United States since Hurricane Sandy in 2012. The Spanish name Isaias was found by many people to be difficult to enunciate, and was mispronounced by some weather forecasters in the United States. Despite the large amount of damage caused by the hurricane, the name was not retired following the season, making Isaias the third-costliest Atlantic tropical cyclone (after Imelda and Sally) not to have its name retired.

Meteorological history

The National Hurricane Center (NHC) first began tracking a vigorous tropical wave off the west coast of Africa on July 23. The wave gradually organized and became better defined, developing a broad area of low pressure on July 25. Though the circulation was broad and disorganized, convection continued to increase over the system, and the system obtained gale-force winds on July 28. Although the system still lacked a well-defined center, an imminent threat of tropical cyclogenesis and tropical storm-force winds to land areas prompted its designation as Potential Tropical Cyclone Nine at 15:00 UTC on July 28. The system moved just south of Dominica on July 29, and at 03:00 UTC on the following day, the system organized sufficiently to become a tropical cyclone. Due to its precursor disturbance already having gale-force winds, it was immediately declared a tropical storm and given the name Isaias. When Tropical Storm Isaias developed, it became the earliest ninth named storm on record, breaking the record of Hurricane Irene in 2005 by eight days. Isaias continued strengthening after reaching tropical storm status, with 1-minute sustained winds reaching  on July 30 as it made landfall on the southern coast of the Dominican Republic. Contrary to predictions by meteorologists, the mountainous terrain of Hispaniola did not weaken the storm as the system had a broad circulation and developed a new low-pressure center to the north of the island, allowing Isaias to maintain its intensity.

Early the next day, hurricane hunters unexpectedly found that Isaias had strengthened into a hurricane. Moderate to strong southwesterly wind shear and dry air entrainment began affecting the storm a few hours later, resulting in the low-level circulation center (LLCC) being exposed near the western edge of the convection. After a brief weakening trend, Isaias began to intensify again, with deep convection firing over the exposed center and an eye feature forming, as seen on Bahamian radar. Land interaction and the continued effects of wind shear and dry air continued to weaken the system, and Isaias dropped below hurricane strength at 21:00 UTC, as its center became completely devoid of convection, although a large burst of convection formed over the center shortly after it moved back over water.

As the storm approached Southeast Florida, a strong mid-level circulation formed just northeast of the storm's low-level circulation center, spawning intense convection mainly north and east of the LLCC. As the storm turned northeastward, it entered a more favorable environment for strengthening, with wind shear relaxing just enough to allow the storm to redevelop intense convection. At 03:10 UTC on August 4, the hurricane made landfall near Ocean Isle Beach, North Carolina at the same intensity. With its landfall, Isaias became the earliest fifth named storm to make landfall in the United States. The previous record for the earliest fifth storm to make a U.S. landfall was August 18, set during the 1916 season. Following landfall, Isaias continued to accelerate and only weakened slowly, dropping below hurricane status at 07:00 UTC over North Carolina. Isaias moved quickly to the north-northeast, crossing through Virginia, Maryland, Pennsylvania, New Jersey, and then into New York. The system lost tropical characteristics as it merged with a cold front to the west, becoming extratropical at 03:00 UTC on August 5, over southern Quebec, east-southeast of Montreal, with the NHC discontinuing advisories on the storm at 09:00 UTC. Afterward, Isaias's extratropical remnant moved northwestward, before turning eastward on August 6. Later that day, Isaias's low-pressure center split into two separate lows, with the newer low to the east absorbing the original low shortly afterward.

Preparations
Numerous tropical storm, hurricane, and storm surge watches and warnings were issued for areas in the path of Isaias.

Antillean Islands
The first tropical storm watches and warnings were posted for Puerto Rico, the Virgin Islands, the Leeward Islands, the Dominican Republic, and Haiti when the system was designated Potential Tropical Cyclone Nine.

Bahamas
With the system approaching and strengthening, hurricane warnings were posted for the Northwestern Bahamas at 00:00 UTC on July 31. The sudden upgrade to hurricane status caused all of the Bahamas to go under hurricane warnings at 03:40 UTC.

People living on Abaco and Grand Bahama islands were evacuated before the storm. Many of the citizens were still living in temporary structures due to damage caused by Hurricane Dorian in 2019. Many of the structures were weak and could be easily destroyed by tropical storm and hurricane-force winds. The meteorology department of the Bahamas advised citizens to "hunker down". The government of the Bahamas lifted the COVID-19 lockdown instituted for controlling the virus before the storm so people could freely travel to safer places. Shelters were opened on larger islands in the island chain, with people on smaller, less populated, islands needing to travel to reach a shelter. Bahamas Power and Light shut off electricity to areas at high risk of flooding on New Providence, the most populous island in the Bahamas, until it was safe to re-energize.

United States

Southeast
Tropical storm watches were first initiated in Southeast Florida at 21:00 UTC on July 30, with more watches and warnings going up as the storm got closer. Hurricane warnings were issued as the storm approached, but they were downgraded to tropical storm warnings when the storm weakened. Hurricane warnings were issued for areas near the South Carolina–North Carolina border after the storm was forecasted to reach minimal hurricane status again just before landfall. At one point, tropical storm watches and warnings extended over 1,000 miles from Florida to Maine. Tornado watches were also issued in Northeastern South Carolina and Eastern North Carolina.

In anticipation of the storm, the state of Florida closed COVID-19 testing sites on July 30 due to potential impacts from Isaias. The next day, Florida governor Ron DeSantis declared a state of emergency for the eastern coast of Florida ahead of Isaias. Both Biscayne National Park and the Everglades National Park closed in preparation for Hurricane Isaias, although Dry Tortugas National Park remained open.

In Georgia, beaches were closed and the Coast Health District suspended all operations. The Sidney Lanier Bridge in Glynn County was closed at 6 a.m. on August 3 as the storm approached. Savannah's Talmadge Memorial Bridge was also scheduled to close at 2 p.m. that day, but remained open. Inspections were planned for both bridges after the storm passed.

On July 31, North Carolina governor Roy Cooper declared a state of emergency ahead of the storm. A mandatory evacuation of Ocracoke Island, North Carolina, was issued that same day. Both Cape Lookout National Seashore and Cape Hatteras National Seashore closed ahead of the hurricane on August 1.

Mid-Atlantic
Tropical storm watches and warnings, as well as flood watches and a tornado watch, were issued as Isaias approached the region. In Washington, D.C., Cleveland Park Station was shut down in advance due to potential flooding. In Maryland, multiple closures were announced for August 4 due to the storm's passage, including the Maryland Zoo. All coronavirus testing was halted and multiple counties postponed trash pickups. Free sandbags were also handed out to Baltimore residents and some city parking garages allowed cars to be stored in them during the storm free of charge as well. Further north, Hershey Park announced they were closing for the day due to the storm.

Northeast
Just before the storm arrived, governor Phil Murphy declared a state of emergency for the entire state of New Jersey. New York Governor Andrew Cuomo declared a state of emergency for 14 counties after the event occurred.

New York City mayor Bill de Blasio stated in a press conference on July 31 that the city would be monitoring the storm, but that the projections looked "pretty favorable". On August 3, the National Weather Service issued a tropical storm warning for the New York City metro, with Emergency Management issuing a Travel advisory that evening, stating that the strongest of the storm would be from 12 to 2 p.m. EDT on August 4. The MTA suspended all above ground rail service, including the Long Island Railroad, on the morning of August 4 as well. On the morning of August 4, a tornado watch was issued for New York City, Long Island, New Jersey, and a portion of Connecticut.

Tropical storm watches were issued for the New England states as the storm began to move up the coast of Florida before being upgraded into warnings as the storm accelerated towards the region. A tornado watch was also issued for Southern New England on the afternoon of August 4. Flood watches were also issued for western portions of the region.

Canada
On the morning of August 4, Environment Canada's Hurricane Forecasting Center estimated that Isaias, as a post-tropical storm, would pass through Montérégie and the Cantons de l'Est in the evening and reach the Quebec region on Wednesday morning.  of rain were expected.

Impacts
There were 12 fatalities directly related to Isaias in the Caribbean Islands and eastern United States (10 in the eastern U.S., one in Puerto Rico, and one in the Dominican Republic). Among them, six were due to wind, three were drownings due to freshwater flooding, two were the result of tornadoes and one was a drowning due to a rip current. Additionally, five indirect deaths (four in the U.S. and one in the Dominican Republic) were attributable to the storm. Overall, Isaias caused approximately $5.025 billion (2020 USD) in damage ($224.8 million in the Caribbean Islands and $4.8 billion in the U.S.).

Caribbean
Most of the Caribbean islands were suffering from moderate to severe drought conditions from an unusually dry spring and early summer. The drought was particularly severe in Puerto Rico and the Dominican Republic, with the governor of Puerto Rico declaring a state of emergency in late June and ordering rationing of water, subjecting residents in affected areas to 24-hour water shutoffs every other day. Heavy rain from Isaias and its precursor disturbance alleviated drought in many areas of the Caribbean.

Lesser Antilles
The precursor disturbance to Isaias brought squally conditions to the Windward Islands.

Greater Antilles

In Puerto Rico, about 448,000 people and 23 hospitals lost power and about 150,000 people lost water service due to electric blackouts and blocked intakes. The entire city of Yauco had no power, and all roads leading to the town were either flooded or blocked by fallen trees. Many surrounding towns in eastern Puerto Rico also had no drinking water nor electricity from a lack of access to the areas of damage. Three gates on the Carraízo reservoir dam in Trujillo Alto, Puerto Rico, were opened because of runoff from Isaias. A woman was dragged by a river in Rincón, Puerto Rico while she was crossing a bridge due to heavy rain; she was found dead two days later. Jayuya, a town in the center of Puerto Rico experienced substantial effects including the loss of its 1.5 million dollar hot air balloon, an important tourist attraction. Due to the extensive damage, President Donald Trump approved an emergency declaration request from Puerto Rico's governor Wanda Vázquez Garced. Mayagüez, one of the hardest-hit municipalities, saw damage exceeding $13 million. Damage to agriculture across the territory reached $47.5 million.

One person was killed in El Seibo Province, in the Dominican Republic, when a power line fell on his horse a few feet away from him, killing him and the animal. A 5-year-old boy was also killed when a tree fell and crushed his home in Altamira in Puerto Plata province. Widespread flooding was reported in Hato Mayor del Rey, a town of 70,000 inhabitants. The storm had limited effects in neighboring Haiti with damage reported to a few homes and crops.

Bahamas
Isaias passed over the Bahamas from July 31 to August 1, hitting some areas still recovering from the devastation of Hurricane Dorian a year before. Tropical storm-force winds and heavy rain damaged roofs and toppled trees. Initial damage assessments began on August 2, with reports indicating damage in the Berry Islands and Andros Island was generally minor.

United States

Isaias caused over 2.7 million power outages along the East Coast, with almost half of them occurring in New Jersey. Additionally, 109 tornado warnings were issued across 12 states with 39 tornadoes touching down, eight of which were significant (EF2+). Total damage across the United States amounted to $4.8 billion.

Florida
The outer rainbands of Isaias began to impact the Florida Peninsula on August 1, bringing gusty winds, heavy rainfall, and flooding to the area. There were some reports of power outages due to downed power lines, but damage was mostly minor and far less than originally expected due to a weakened Isaias.

The Carolinas

Hurricane Isaias generated the third highest high tide ever recorded in Myrtle Beach, South Carolina and trees and power lines were knocked down in Myrtle Grove, North Carolina, by the rapidly-forming northern eyewall as the storm came ashore. In North Myrtle Beach, South Carolina alone, 483 properties suffered damage; losses exceeded $2.4 million in the city. Throughout the Carolinas, over 400,000 people lost power at the height of the storm, mostly in North Carolina. Heavy damage was inflicted to multiple homes in Oak Island and Ocean Isle Beach, North Carolina, including three that were destroyed in the latter community by a large fire. Damage in Holden Beach alone exceeded $40 million. At least 109 baby sea turtles were found dead in North Myrtle Beach following the storm's landfall.

Favorable shear profiles also led to widespread tornado warnings with 15 tornadoes touching down. On August 3, a strong waterspout came ashore as an EF2 tornado and struck Bald Head Island causing heavy damage to vegetation, before moving into Southport, North Carolina where homes lost their roofs and had blown in windows. Later, another waterspout came ashore on Garden City Beach, South Carolina as an EF0 tornado causing minor damage to a few homes, although one person was injured in one of the beachfront homes. Early on August 4, a large EF3 tornado obliterated an unanchored home and a mobile home park south of Windsor, North Carolina, killing two and injuring 14. This was the strongest tornado spawned by a tropical cyclone since Hurricane Rita spawned an F3 tornado in Clayton, Louisiana, on September 24, 2005. An EF0 tornado near Chowan University in Murfreesboro, North Carolina generated a TDS as it caused widespread tree damage, prompting a PDS tornado warning.

Isaias indirectly led to the death of two people in Wilmington, North Carolina, on August 5. Both men were clearing debris when lightning from a thunderstorm struck and killed them.

Mid-Atlantic
Across Virginia and Maryland, Isaias left about 400,000 people without power. Nearly 100,000 residences lost power in Delaware. One person was killed after a tree fell on his moving vehicle in St. Mary's County, Maryland. A woman in Milford, Delaware, was killed when a tree branch struck her while she was surveying damage.  A storm related death was reported in Lancaster County, Virginia without further details. High winds overturned three tractor-trailers along the U.S. Route 50 bridge over the Choptank River in Cambridge, Maryland. Winds from the storm caused roof damage and downed trees and wires in Ocean City, Maryland. In the Delaware beach towns in Sussex County, winds from the storm knocked down trees, signs, and wires. Damage to the beaches was minimal. The storm caused heavy wind damage to homes, trees, and fences in a neighborhood in Bear, Delaware.

Multiple tornado warnings were issued throughout Virginia, Maryland, and Delaware, including one for a storm that moved directly through Hampton Roads, with 19 tornadoes across the region. An EF2 tornado caused major damage in Courtland, Virginia while EF0 and EF1 tornadoes hit Downtown Suffolk, Virginia. The latter two tornadoes damaged or destroyed 110 structures in Suffolk with losses estimated at $2.2 million. Around sunrise, a high-end EF2 tornado caused considerable damage in Palmer and Kilmarnock, Virginia, injuring five. As that tornado dissipated around 6:00 am, another EF2 tornado struck Mardela Springs, Maryland, knocking down several trees and lifting a home off its foundation. Yet another EF2 tornado touched down in George Island Landing, Maryland, around 7:20 am, destroying several chickenhouses. An additional low-end EF2 tornado traveled along a  track across Kent and New Castle counties in Delaware. This tornado struck Dover around 9:00 am, causing significant damage to trees and buildings. A middle school in Dover had portions of its roof torn away, streets were flooded, and power outages were reported, with a state of emergency declared in the city. This was the longest-tracked tornado ever documented in the state of Delaware, breaking the previous record of 18 miles. A tree fell onto a home in Smyrna. The tornado also caused damage to homes in Middletown. The storm also produced an EF0 tornado in Queenstown, Maryland, and an EF1 tornado in Sandtown, Delaware. Throughout the state of Delaware, damage is estimated to be in excess of $20 million. Delaware saw 58,000 customers lose power.

Pennsylvania

In Pennsylvania, widespread flooding occurred in the Philadelphia metropolitan area. The worst of the flooding occurred in Harleysville, Pennsylvania with a total of  being recorded. The on and off-ramps of Interstate 95 at Broad Street were closed due to flooding. Water rescues were made in Belmont Hills and Chadds Ford. In Prospect Park, flooding occurred along Lincoln Avenue. The storm caused flooding along the Schuylkill River in the Manayunk neighborhood of Philadelphia, with residents of an apartment complex evacuated. An unsecured barge along the Schuylkill River in Philadelphia broke loose from flooding caused by the storm and struck the Vine Street Expressway Bridge that carries Interstate 676 across the river, causing a portion of Interstate 676 to be closed and SEPTA Regional Rail service to be suspended. A 44-year-old woman died when her vehicle was swept downstream in a flooded area of Upper Saucon Township and a child was found dead in Towamencin Township, Pennsylvania after going missing during the height of the storm. An EF0 tornado was confirmed in Worcester Township, Pennsylvania, while an EF2 tornado traveled across Philadelphia and Bucks counties along a path from Northeast Philadelphia to Doylestown. This tornado caused damage to buildings and trees near the Philadelphia Mills shopping mall and caused significant damage and power outages in Doylestown, where cars were overturned and the roof was ripped off a daycare at Doylestown Hospital. Over 364,000 customers lost power.

New Jersey
Isaias was the second tropical cyclone to affect the two states in a 3-week time span after Tropical Storm Fay in early July. In New Jersey, the storm spawned a tornado that brought winds as high as  just off the coast, as well as heavy rainfall, causing numerous power outages. Winds from the storm brought down a church steeple in Ocean City. Two tornadoes were confirmed to have touched down; the first one was a large wedge EF1 tornado that caused considerable damage in Strathmere and Marmora in Upper Township. Another EF1 tornado occurred in Barnegat Township. Service on multiple NJ Transit rail lines was suspended due to storm damage. In Livingston, more than 100 trees were felled by the storm, including one on New Jersey Route 10, blocking traffic. A 21-year-old man drowned off the coast of Cape May, New Jersey, due to strong rip currents and rough surf. A man in River Vale, New Jersey was killed after possibly being electrocuted from downed wires, while doing yard work to clean up from the storm. New Jersey recorded 1.3 million power outages.

New York

In New York, a person was killed in New York City when a tree fell on their car in Queens. Service along the Metro-North Railroad and Long Island Rail Road was also suspended. There were over 3,100 trees knocked down by the storm in Queens, causing power outages and damage to homes. A woman was taken to the hospital in critical condition after being struck in the head by a falling tree branch in Brooklyn. A building in Brooklyn partially collapsed as a result of storm damage, resulting in evacuations. Tree damage was especially heavy in Rockland County. Five overturned trucks on the Verrazzano-Narrows Bridge forced the bridge to shut down. A game between the New York Yankees and Philadelphia Phillies was postponed due to the storm. Over 579,000 customers lost power due to Isaias in New York. Both Jones Beach State Park and Robert Moses State Park closed due to the tropical storm due to a loss of power.

New England
Multiple tornado warnings were issued throughout New England with a waterspout briefly moving ashore as an EF1 tornado in Westport, Connecticut, ripping a roof off a house and snapping large pine trees. It was the first tornado on record in Connecticut to be associated with a tropical storm or hurricane. The storm left roughly 750,000 Connecticut residents without power, including 625,000 customers of Eversource Energy and 123,000 customers of the United Illuminating Company. Massachusetts saw an additional 148,000 power outages and Rhode Island saw 130,000 power outages. Two people died after being hit by falling trees in Naugatuck, Connecticut, and North Conway, New Hampshire. Another man was indirectly killed in a chainsaw accident while helping a friend cut some downed trees from the storm in Newtown, Connecticut.

Canada
Damage was rather minimal in Eastern Canada. By 8 A.M. EDT on August 5, 26,138 Hydro-Quebec customers had lost power. Across the province of Quebec, over 38,189 homes lost power because of the tropical storm. At the height of the storm, nearly 75,000 people were without electricity, more than half of them in the Capitale-Nationale, where winds were around 70 kilometers per hour (43 miles per hour). At Île d'Orléans, gusts of 91 km/h were recorded (56.5 mph). Further west, Trois-Rivières received  of rain, and  fell in Charlevoix.

Aftermath
In North Carolina, Governor Roy Cooper, toured the area hit by the EF3 tornado in Windsor, North Carolina, saying it was "devastating" to see what happened to the area. A state of emergency was also declared in 13 counties in New York due to damage caused by the storm. Thousands of customers throughout the Tri-State (NY-NJ-CT) area remained without power for over a week after the storm, with Governor Cuomo and the New York State Legislature launching an investigation into different utility companies' respective responses. A state of emergency was declared in Connecticut due to 700,000 residents losing power. On August 6, Connecticut governor Ned Lamont activated the Connecticut National Guard to assist with power restoration efforts in the state.

See also

 Tropical cyclones in 2020
 List of Category 1 Atlantic hurricanes
 List of costliest Atlantic hurricanes
 List of Florida hurricanes (2000–present)
 List of North Carolina hurricanes (2000–present)
 List of Maryland hurricanes (1950–present)
 List of Delaware hurricanes
 List of New Jersey hurricanes
 List of Pennsylvania hurricanes
 List of New York hurricanes
 List of New England hurricanes
 Tropical Storm Doria (1971) – Tropical storm that took a similar track through the eastern United States
 Hurricane David (1979) – A Category 5 hurricane that affected similar areas
 Tropical Storm Chris (1988) – Tropical storm that took a similar track
 Hurricane Floyd (1999) - a category 4 hurricane that took a similar track
 Hurricane Hanna (2008) – A Category 1 hurricane which affected similar areas
 Hurricane Irene (2011) – A Category 3 hurricane which followed a similar track
 Hurricane Dorian (2019) – A powerful Category 5 hurricane that devastated similar areas the previous year
 Tropical Storm Fay (2020) – Affected similar areas of the northeastern United States earlier in the year

References

External links

 The National Hurricane Center's Advisory Archive on Hurricane Isaias
 National Hurricane Center (NHC)
 Weather Prediction Center (WPC)

 
Tropical cyclones in 2020
Category 1 Atlantic hurricanes
Cape Verde hurricanes
2020 Atlantic hurricane season
2020 in the Caribbean
2020 in the Bahamas
2020 in the United States
Hurricanes in New Jersey
Hurricanes in North Carolina
Hurricanes in Florida
Hurricanes in Virginia
Hurricanes in New York (state)
Hurricanes in New England
Hurricanes in Maryland
Hurricanes in Delaware
Hurricanes in Pennsylvania
Hurricanes in South Carolina
Hurricanes in the Bahamas